The 1921 Boston College Eagles football team represented Boston College an independent during the 1921 college football season. Led by third-year head coach Frank Cavanaugh, Boston College compiled a record of 4–3–1.

Schedule

References

Boston College
Boston College Eagles football seasons
Boston College Eagles football
1920s in Boston